Records and firsts in spaceflight are broadly divided into crewed and uncrewed categories. Records involving animal spaceflight have also been noted in earlier experimental flights, typically to establish the feasibility of sending humans to outer space.

The notion of "firsts" in spaceflight follows a long tradition of firsts in aviation, but is also closely tied to the Space Race. During the 1950s and 1960s, the Soviet Union and the United States competed to be the first countries to accomplish various feats. In 1957, the Soviet Union launched Sputnik 1, the first artificial orbital satellite. In 1961, Soviet Vostok 1 cosmonaut Yuri Gagarin became the first person to enter space and orbit the Earth, and in 1969 American Apollo 11 astronaut Neil Armstrong became the first person to set foot on the Moon. No human has traveled beyond low Earth orbit since 1972, when the Apollo program ended.

During the 1970s, the Soviet Union directed its energies to human habitation of space stations of increasingly long durations. In the 1980s, the United States began launching its Space Shuttles, which carried larger crews and thus could increase the number of people in space at a given time. Following their first mission of détente on the 1975 Apollo-Soyuz Test Project, the Soviet Union and the United States again collaborated with each other on the Shuttle-Mir initiative, efforts which led to the International Space Station (ISS), which has been continuously inhabited by humans for over 20 years.

Other firsts in spaceflight involve demographics, private enterprise, and distance. Dozens of countries have sent at least one traveler to space. In 1963, Valentina Tereshkova became the first woman in space, aboard Vostok 6. In the early 21st century, private companies joined government agencies in crewed spaceflight: in 2004, the sub-orbital spaceplane SpaceShipOne became the first privately funded crewed craft to enter space; in 2020, SpaceX's Dragon 2 became the first privately developed crewed vehicle to reach orbit when it ferried a crew to the ISS.

First independent suborbital and orbital human spaceflight by country

Human spaceflight firsts

Note: Some space records are disputed as a result of ambiguities surrounding the border of space. Most records follow the FAI definition of the space border which the FAI sets at an altitude of 100 km (62.14 mi). By contrast, the NASA-, USAF- and FAA-defined border of space is at 50 mi (80.47 km).

Most spaceflights

Most orbital launches from Earth
7 launches
 Jerry L. Ross (USA), Space Shuttle (1985–2002)
 Franklin Chang Díaz (Costa Rica/USA), Space Shuttle (1986–2002)

Most orbital launches overall
7 launches
 John W. Young (USA) launched from Earth 6 times (two Gemini, two Apollo Command Module, two Space Shuttle) and from the Moon once (Apollo Lunar Module Ascent Stage) (1965–1983)
 Jerry L. Ross (USA), Space Shuttle (1985–2002)
 Franklin Chang Díaz (Costa Rica/USA*), Space Shuttle (1986–2002)

Largest number of different spacecraft at launch (from Earth only)
3 spacecraft
 Walter Schirra (USA) – launched aboard a Mercury, Gemini, and Apollo (1962–1968)
 John W. Young (USA) – launched aboard a Gemini, Apollo, and Space Shuttle (1965–1983)
 Soichi Noguchi (Japan) – launched aboard a Space Shuttle, Soyuz, and SpaceX Crew Dragon (2005–2020)
 Shane Kimbrough (USA) – launched aboard a Space Shuttle, Soyuz, and SpaceX Crew Dragon (2008–2021)
 Akihiko Hoshide (Japan) – launched aboard a Space Shuttle, Soyuz, and SpaceX Crew Dragon (2008–2021)
 Thomas Marshburn (USA) – launched aboard a Space Shuttle, Soyuz, and SpaceX Crew Dragon (2007–2021)
 Michael López-Alegría (USA) – launched aboard a Space Shuttle, Soyuz, and SpaceX Crew Dragon (1995–2022)
 Koichi Wakata (Japan) – launched aboard a Space Shuttle, Soyuz, and SpaceX Crew Dragon (1996–2022)

Largest number of different launch vehicles (overall)
4 launch vehicles
 John W. Young (USA) – launched from Earth aboard a Gemini, Apollo, and Space Shuttle, and launched from the Moon aboard the Apollo Lunar Module Ascent Stage

Largest number of different launch sites
3 sites
 Frederick W. Sturckow (USA) – Kennedy Space Center (four times aboard a Space Shuttle 1998–2010), Mojave Air and Space Port (aboard a Virgin Galactic SpaceShipTwo in 2018), and Spaceport America (also aboard a SpaceShipTwo, in 2021). 
 John Young (USA) - Cape Kennedy Air Force Station (now Cape Canaveral Space Force Station, twice aboard a Gemini capsule 1965-1966), Kennedy Space Center (four times, twice aboard an Apollo capsule 1969-1971, twice aboard a Space Shuttle 1981-1983), Descartes Highlands (from the Moon aboard an Apollo Lunar Module, in 1971).
 Neil Armstrong (USA) - Cape Kennedy Air Force Station (aboard a Gemini capsule in 1966), Kennedy Space Center (aboard an Apollo capsule in 1969), Tranquility Base (from the Moon aboard an Apollo Lunar Module, in 1969).
 Buzz Aldrin (USA) - Cape Kennedy Air Force Station (aboard a Gemini capsule in 1966), Kennedy Space Center (aboard an Apollo capsule in 1969), Tranquility Base (from the Moon aboard an Apollo Lunar Module, in 1969).
 Pete Conrad (USA) - Cape Kennedy Air Force Station (twice aboard a Gemini capsule 1965-1966), Kennedy Space Center (twice aboard an Apollo capsule 1969-1973), Ocean of Storms (from the Moon aboard an Apollo Lunar Module, in 1969).
 Alan Shepard (USA) - Cape Kennedy Air Force Station (aboard a Mercury capsule in 1961), Kennedy Space Center (aboard an Apollo capsule in 1971), Fra Mauro (from the Moon aboard an Apollo Lunar Module, in 1971).
 David Scott (USA) - Cape Kennedy Air Force Station (aboard a Gemini capsule in 1966), Kennedy Space Center (twice aboard an Apollo capsule 1969-1971), Hadley Rille (from the Moon aboard an Apollo Lunar Module, in 1971).
 Gene Cernan (USA) - Cape Kennedy Air Force Station (aboard a Gemini capsule in 1966), Kennedy Space Center (aboard an Apollo capsule in 1969), Taurus-Littrow (from the Moon aboard an Apollo Lunar Module, in 1969).

Note: SpaceShipTwo flights are suborbital. SpaceShipTwo flights surpass the U.S. definition of spaceflight, but fall short of the Kármán line, the FAI definition used for most space recordkeeping.

Duration records

Total human spaceflight time by country

Most time in space
The record for most time in space is held by Russian cosmonaut Gennady Padalka, who has spent 878 days in space over five missions. On 28 June 2015, Padalka surpassed the previous record holder, cosmonaut Sergei Krikalev, who spent 803 days, 9 hours and 39 minutes (about 2.2 years) during six spaceflights on Soyuz, the Space Shuttle, Mir, and the International Space Station. Second place is currently held by Yuri Malenchenko, who has spent 828 days on six spaceflights.

, the 50 space travelers with the most total time in space are:

Color key:

Ten longest human spaceflights

Longest single flight by a woman
NASA astronaut Christina Koch holds the record for the longest single spaceflight by a woman (328 days), returning on February 6, 2020. She surpassed NASA astronaut Peggy Whitson's 289 days during Expedition 61 in 2019. In third place is American astronaut Anne McClain with 204 days.

Longest continuous occupation of space
An international partnership consisting of Russia, the United States, Canada, Japan and the member states of the European Space Agency have jointly maintained a continuous human presence in space since 31 October 2000, when Soyuz TM-31 was launched. Two days later it docked with the International Space Station.

Longest continuous occupation of a spacecraft
The International Space Station has been continuously occupied by a Russian and US crew member since 2 November 2000. It broke the record of 9 years and 358 days of the Soviet/Russian Space Station Mir on 23 October 2010.

Longest solo flight
Valery Bykovsky flew solo for 4 days, 23 hours in Vostok 5 from 14 to 19 June 1963. The flight set a space endurance record which was broken in 1965 by the (non-solo) Gemini 5 flight. The Apollo program included long solo spaceflight, and during the Apollo 16 mission, T. K. Mattingly orbited solo around the Moon for more than 3 days and 9 hours.

Longest time on the lunar surface
Eugene Cernan and Harrison Schmitt of the Apollo 17 mission stayed for 74 hours 59 minutes and 40 seconds (over 3 days) on the lunar surface after they landed on 11 December 1972. They performed three EVAs (extra-vehicular activity) totaling 22 hours 3 minutes, 57 seconds. As Apollo commanders were the first to leave the LM and the last to get back in, Cernan's EVA time was slightly longer.

Longest time in lunar orbit
Ronald Evans of Apollo 17 mission stayed in lunar orbit for 6 days and 4 hours (148 hours) along with five mice; however, for the solo portion of a flight around the Moon, T. K. Mattingly on Apollo 16 spent 1 hour 38 minutes longer than Evans' solo duration.

Speed and altitude records

Farthest humans from Earth
This record-breaking distance was reached at 00:21 UTC on 15 April 1970.

Highest altitude for crewed non-lunar mission

Fastest

The Apollo 10 crew (Thomas Stafford, John W. Young and Eugene Cernan) achieved the highest speed relative to Earth ever attained by humans: 39,897 kilometers per hour (11,082 meters per second or 24,791 miles per hour, about 32 times the speed of sound and 0.0037% of the speed of light). The record was set 26 May 1969.

In 2021, the Parker Solar Probe at 587,000 km/h became the fastest moving spacecraft, at about 1/1850 (or 0.05%) the speed of light.

Age records

Earliest-born to reach space

Suborbital flight
 Man - Joe Walker (born 20 February 1921), on X-15 Flight 90 on 19 July 1963 (about 12 minutes.)
 Woman - Wally Funk (born 1 February 1939), on Blue Origin NS-16, on 20 July 2021 (about 10 minutes.)

Orbital spaceflight
 Man – Georgy Beregovoy (born 15 April 1921), on Soyuz 3 on 26 October 1968 (81 orbits in about 4 days.)
 Woman – Valentina Tereshkova (born 6 March 1937), on Vostok 6 on 16–19 June 1963 (46 orbits, about 3 days.)

Recently-born to reach space

Suborbital flight
 Man - Oliver Daemen (born 20 August 2002), on Blue Origin NS-16, on 20 July 2021 (about 10 minutes.)
 Woman - Katya Echazarreta (born 15 June 1995), on Blue Origin NS-21, on 4 June 2022 (about 10 minutes.)

Orbital spaceflight
 Man – Yozo Hirano (born 12 October 1985), on Soyuz MS-20 on 8 December 2021 (189 orbits in about 12 days.)
 Woman – Hayley Arceneaux (born 4 December 1991), on Inspiration4 on 15 September 2021 (48 orbits, about 3 days.)

Youngest

Suborbital flight
 Man - Oliver Daemen (aged 18 years), on Blue Origin NS-16, on 20 July 2021 (about 10 minutes.)
 Woman - Katya Echazarreta (aged 26 years), on Blue Origin NS-21, on 4 June 2022 (about 10 minutes.)

Orbital spaceflight
 Man – Gherman Titov (aged 25 years), on Vostok 2 on 6 August 1961 (17.5 orbits, about 1 day.)
 Woman – Valentina Tereshkova (aged 26 years), on Vostok 6 on 16–19 June 1963 (48 orbits, about 3 days.)

Oldest

Suborbital flight
 Man - William Shatner (aged 90), on Blue Origin NS-18, on 13 October 2021 (about 10 minutes.)
 Woman - Wally Funk (aged 82), on Blue Origin NS-16, on 20 July 2021 (about 10 minutes.)

Orbital spaceflight
 Man – John Glenn (aged 77), on STS-95 on 29 October 1998 (about 9 days, 20 hours.)
 Woman – Peggy Whitson (aged 56), on Soyuz MS-03 on 17 November 2016 (about 289 days.) She turned 57 on 9 February 2017, while still in space.

Spacewalk records

Most spacewalks (number and duration)
Both of these are the record for the largest total number of spacewalks by a male and a female, and the most cumulative time spent on spacewalks by a male and a female.
 Man – Anatoly Solovyev, 16 spacewalks for a total time of 82 hours, 21 minutes.
 Woman – Peggy Whitson, 10 spacewalks for a total time of 60 hours, 21 minutes.

Most spacewalks during a single mission
 7: Anatoly Solovyev, during Expedition 24 on the Soviet/Russian space station Mir, in 1997–98. (Two were internal "spacewalks" inside a depressurized module.)
 7: Andrew Morgan, during his first spaceflight on board the ISS for Expedition 60/61/62 in 2019–2020, he spent 45 hours and 48 minutes outside the station.

Longest single spacewalk
 8 hrs 56 min, by James Voss and Susan Helms, 11 March 2001 on an ISS assembly mission during Shuttle mission STS-102. The space walkers were delayed early in their excursion when a device to help hold an astronaut's feet to the shuttle's robot arm became untethered, and Voss had to retrieve a spare from storage on the exterior of the station's Unity module. After about six hours of work, the pair reentered Space Shuttle Discovery’s airlock.

Greatest distance from a spacecraft during a spacewalk
All-time (and while on a planetary body): 7.6 kilometers (4.7 miles, 25,029 feet), Apollo 17, Gene Cernan and Harrison Schmitt, EVA-2, December 12, 1972.  During their second of three moonwalks, Cernan and Schmitt rode the Lunar Roving Vehicle to geological station 2, Nansen Crater, at the foot of the South Massif.  As all spacewalks not occurring on a planetary body (the Moon) have involved short maximum distances from the spacecraft (see below), this remains the furthest distance that humans have traveled away from the safety of a pressurizable spacecraft, during an EVA of any type.
Orbital flight: about 100 meters (or 330 feet), Bruce McCandless, STS-41-B, February 7, 1984.  With the exception of six Manned Maneuvering Unit (MMU) sorties in 1984 and a test of the Simplified Aid For EVA Rescue (SAFER) in 1994, all other orbital spacewalks have involved a safety tether, anchoring the spacefarer to the spacecraft at a short distance.  Among the former untethered spacewalks, Bruce McCandless' first test of the MMU established an orbital EVA distance record from a spacecraft which remained unbroken by later untethered EVAs.

Animal records

First animals in space
They were also the first animals to safely return from space. Albert II, a rhesus monkey, became the first mammal in space aboard a U.S. V-2 rocket on June 14, 1949, and died on reentry due to a parachute failure. The first dogs in space were launched 22 July 1951 aboard a Soviet R-1V. This flight preceded the first American canine space mission by two weeks.

First animal in orbit
Laika was a Soviet female canine launched on 3 November 1957 on Sputnik 2. The technology to de-orbit had not yet been developed, so there was no expectation for survival. She died several hours into flight. Belka and Strelka became the first canines to safely return to Earth from orbit on 19 August 1960.

First Hominidae in space
On 31 January 1961, through NASA's Mercury-Redstone 2 mission the chimpanzee Ham became the first great ape or Hominidae in space.

Longest canine single flight

First animals beyond low Earth orbit
An assortment of animals including a pair of Russian tortoises, as well as wine flies and mealworms flew around the Moon with a number of other biological specimens including seeds and bacteria on a circumlunar mission aboard the Soviet Zond 5 spacecraft on 18 September 1968. It had been launched by a Proton-K rocket on 14 September. 

Zond 5 came within  of the Moon and then successfully returned to Earth, the first spacecraft in history to return safely to Earth from the Moon.

Notable uncrewed or non-human spaceflights

See also

 First images of Earth from space
 Human presence in space
 List of crewed spacecraft
 List of cumulative spacewalk records
 List of International Space Station spacewalks
 List of Mir spacewalks
 List of spacewalkers
 List of spacewalks 2000–2014
 List of spacewalks and moonwalks 1965–1999
 List of spacewalks since 2015
 Manned Maneuvering Unit
 Omega Speedmaster
 Simplified Aid For EVA Rescue
 Space suit
 Suitport

References

External links 
 Russia's unmanned Moon missions

Aviation records

Spaceflight timelines